Dustin Cooper (born 8 May 1981) is an Australian former professional rugby league footballer who last played for Lézignan Sangliers in the French Elite One Championship, the Boston 13s in the USA Rugby League. He returned to league after a two-year stint in rugby union with Toyota Verblitz in the Japan Top League.

Early life
Cooper was educated at Murgon State High School. He played junior rugby league for Murgon Mustangs, before moving to Brisbane. Before joining the Melbourne Storm, Cooper played with Redcliffe Dolphins in the Brisbane Rugby League A-Grade competition, ending the 2002 season as the leading points scorer.

Rugby League Career
He then moved to Newcastle Knights in 2005-2006, starting as a fullback but eventually filling the utility role.

In 2005, Cooper was one of 11 players fined by Newcastle for misconduct after a pre-season game in Bathurst.

It was alleged that some of the Newcastle players had broken curfew to visit dormitories at Charles Sturt University.  It was reported that one of the players had jumped on a student as she slept in her bed and touched her inappropriately.  One of the Newcastle players Dane Tilse was deregistered by the NRL for 12 months.  Cooper played 14 games for Newcastle in the 2005 NRL season as the club finished last on the table.

In 2007 and 2008 Cooper played with Cronulla-Sutherland Sharks in the second row, finishing his NRL career at the end of the 2008 NRL season. He returned to league in 2011 with the Pia Donkeys, where he plays in the second row. In 2012 Cooper began playing five-eighth for the Boston Thirteens in the USARL and helped them to win a national championship in 2015.

Rugby Union Career
Cooper played as a centre/winger for Toyota Verblitz 2009-2011 in the Japan Top League., and was selected in the Japan Top League All Stars match 2011.
He is also an inaugural member of the Asia Pacific Barbarians, participating in the annual Hong Kong rugby tens tournament in 2011.

References

1981 births
Living people
Australian expatriate rugby union players
Australian expatriate sportspeople in France
Australian expatriate sportspeople in Japan
Australian expatriate sportspeople in the United States
Australian rugby league players
Australian rugby union players
Baroudeurs de Pia XIII players
Boston 13s players
Cronulla-Sutherland Sharks players
Expatriate rugby union players in France
Expatriate rugby union players in Japan
Lézignan Sangliers players
Melbourne Storm players
Newcastle Knights players
Rugby league players from Queensland
Rugby league second-rows
Rugby union players from Queensland
Toyota Verblitz players
United States national rugby league team coaches